Folke Bertil Lind (4 April 1913 – 6 February 2001) was a Swedish footballer. He played 16 seasons for GAIS from 1932/33 to 1947/48. He scored the winning goal for GAIS in the 1942 Svenska Cupen final.

He was part of Sweden's squad at the 1936 Summer Olympics, but he did not play in any matches. Lind was in Sweden's squad for the 1938 World Cup as a reserve, so he did not play any matches in the tournament. His only international was a friendly against Latvia in 1938.

References

1913 births
2001 deaths
GAIS players
Swedish footballers
Sweden international footballers
Association football defenders